"Wiggle Wiggle" is a song by Ronnie Sessions from his eponymous debut album, released in the fall of 1976.  It was the first of four charting singles from the LP.

"Wiggle Wiggle" reached number 16 on the U.S. Billboard Country chart. On the Cash Box Country chart it spent two weeks at number 10.  It did somewhat better in Canada, where it spent six months on the charts, peaking at number 9 for two weeks.

Chart history

References

External links
 

1976 songs
1977 singles
MCA Records singles
Songs written by Layng Martine Jr.